Pascual Pery Junquera (17 October 1911 – 20 June 1989) was a Spanish admiral who served as Minister of the Navy of Spain in 1977, during the Francoist dictatorship.

References

1911 births
1989 deaths
Defence ministers of Spain
Government ministers during the Francoist dictatorship